The following outline is provided as an overview of and topical guide to television broadcasting:

Television broadcasting: form of broadcasting in which a television signal is transmitted by radio waves from a terrestrial (Earth based) transmitter of a television station to TV receivers having an antenna.

Nature of television broadcasting 

Television broadcasting can be described as all of the following:

 Technology
 Electronics technology
 Telecommunication technology
 Broadcasting technology

Types of television broadcasting 
 Terrestrial television
 Closed-circuit television
 Outside broadcasting
Direct broadcast satellite (DBS)

History of television broadcasting 

 History of television

Television broadcasting technology

Infrastructure and broadcasting system
Television set
 List of television manufacturers
Satellite television
Microwave link
Television receive-only
Television transmitter
Transposer
Transmitter station

System standards
System A the 405 line system
441 line system
Broadcast television systems
System B
System G
System H
System I
System M
Terrestrial television

Television signals

Video signal
Analogue television synchronization
Back porch
Black level
Blanking level
Chrominance
Composite video
Frame (video)
Front porch
Horizontal blanking interval
Horizontal scan rate
Luma (video)
Overscan
Raster scan
Television lines
White clipper
Vertical blanking interval
VF bandwidth
VIT signals

The sound signal
Multichannel television sound
NICAM
Pre-emphasis
Sound in syncs
Zweikanalton

Broadcast signal
Beam tilt
Downlink CNR
Earth bulge
Frequency offset
Field strength in free space
Knife-edge effect
Null fill
Output power of an analog TV transmitter
Path loss
Radio propagation
Radiation pattern
Skew
Television interference

Modulation and frequency conversion

Amplitude modulation
Frequency mixer
Frequency modulation
Quadrature amplitude modulation
Vestigial sideband modulation (VSBF)

IF and RF signal
Differential gain
Differential phase
Distortion
Group delay and phase delay
Intercarrier method
Intermediate frequency
Noise (electronics)
Radio frequency
Residual carrier
Split sound system
Superheterodyne transmitter
Television channel frequencies
Ultra high frequency
Very high frequency
Zero reference pulse

Color TV
Colorburst
Color killer
Color television
Dot crawl
Hanover bars
NTSC
PAL
PAL-M
PALplus
PAL-S
SECAM

Stages and output equipment
Amplifiers
Antenna (radio)
Cavity amplifier
Diplexer
Dipole antenna
Dummy load
Electronic filter
Tetrode
Klystron

Measuring instruments
Distortionmeter
Field strength meter
Oscilloscope
Multimeter
Network analyzer
Psophometer
Vectorscope

Television broadcasting by country 

|
 Television in Afghanistan 
 Television in Albania 
 Television in Andorra 
 Television in Angola 
 Television in Argentina 
 Television in Australia 
 Television in Austria 
 Television in Azerbaijan
 Television in Bangladesh 
 Television in Barbados 
 Television in Belarus 
 Television in Belgium 
 Television in Bermuda 
 Television in Bosnia and Herzegovina 
 Television in Brazil 
 Television in Bulgaria 
 Television in Burma
 Television in Burundi
 Television in Canada 
 Television in Chile 
 Television in the People's Republic of China
 Television in the Republic of China
 Television in Colombia 
 Television in Croatia 
 Television in Cuba 
 Television in Cyprus 
 Television in the Czech Republic
 Television in Denmark 
 Television in Ecuador 
 Television in Egypt 
 Television in England (see Television in the United Kingdom) 
 Television in Estonia 
 Television in Finland
 Television in France 
 Television in the Faroe Islands
 Television in Georgia 
 Television in Germany 
 Television in Greece
 Television in Honduras
 Television in Hong Kong
 Television in Hungary
 Television in Iceland 
 Television in India 
 Television in Indonesia 
 Television in Iraq
 Television in Ireland 
 Television in Israel 
 Television in Italy
 Television in Jamaica 
 Television in Japan
 Television in Kyrgyzstan
|
 Television in Latvia 
 Television in Lebanon 
 Television in Liechtenstein 
 Television in Lithuania 
 Television in the Isle of Man 
 Television in Malaysia 
 Television in Mali 
 Television in Malta 
 Television in Mexico 
 Television in Moldova 
 Television in Monaco 
 Television in Montenegro 
 Television in Burma
 Television in Nauru 
 Television in the Netherlands 
 Television in New Zealand 
 Television in North Korea
 Television in North Macedonia 
 Television in Norway
 Television in Pakistan 
 Television in Peru 
 Television in the Philippines 
 Television in Poland 
 Television in Portugal 
 Television in Romania 
 Television in Russia
 Television in San Marino 
 Television in Saudi Arabia
 Television in Scotland 
 Television in Senegal 
 Television in Serbia 
 Television in Singapore 
 Television in Slovakia
 Television in Slovenia 
 Television in South Africa 
 Television in South Korea 
 Television in Spain 
 Television in Sri Lanka 
 Television in Sweden 
 Television in Switzerland 
 Television in Republic of China
 Television in Thailand 
 Television in Trinidad and Tobago 
 Television in Turkey 
 Television in Ukraine 
 Television in the United Kingdom
 Television in the United States 
 Television in Uruguay 
 Television in Venezuela
 Television in Vietnam
Television in Wales (see Television in the United Kingdom)
Television in Western Sahara
Television in Yemen

See also 

 Outline of communication
 Outline of telecommunication
 Outline of radio

External links 

TVRadioWorld TV stations directory
W9WI.com (Terrestrial repeater and TV hobbyist information)
TV Coverage maps and Signal Analysis
 A History of Television at the Canada Science and Technology Museum
 The Encyclopedia of Television at the Museum of Broadcast Communications
 The Evolution of TV, A Brief History of TV Technology in Japan NHK
 Television's History – The First 75 Years
 Worldwide Television Standards
 Global TV Market Data
 Television in Color, April 1944 one of the earliest magazine articles detailing the new technology of color television
Littleton, Cynthia. "Happy 70th Birthday, TV Commercial broadcasts bow on July 1, 1941; Variety calls it 'corney'", Variety, July 1, 2011. WebCitation archive.

This is a list of topics related to television broadcasting.

Television
Television
Television
 
 1
 1